Please Don't Eat My Mother is a 1973 exploitation film directed by Carl J. Monson.

It is an adult-themed parody of Roger Corman's The Little Shop of Horrors.

Plot
A shy and timid man, Henry, who lives with his mother, buys a plant after he thinks he hears it talk to him. His loneliness is very apparent in the way he tries to turn the plant into a friend. The plant turns out to actually be able to talk in a seductive woman's voice. Henry soon discovers the plant likes to eat bugs (and then frogs and dogs and cats but he draws the line at elephants). Eventually the plant wants to try a delicious woman, like in the pictures Henry has hanging in his room.

One day, Henry's mother breaks into his room thinking to confront him with a woman and all she can find are Henry and the plant. But soon the plant eats her and discovers that women are really tasty. When detective O'Columbus shows up, the plant discovers she does not like eating men, just women.

Eventually the plant experiences urges and Henry finds a male specimen. The male eats men while the female eats women. One woman is willing to end Henry's life of virginity but accidentally gets eaten. Henry is broken and tries to kill himself while the plants get passionate with one another. Henry is too clumsy to succeed and changes his mind when he sees all of the little baby plants.

Cast
 Buck Kartalian as Henry Fudd
 Lyn Lundgren as Clarice Fudd
 Art Hedberg as Florist
 Rene Bond as Harry's wife
 Alice Fredlund as Call girl
 Adam Blair 
 Flora Weisel as Girl in Car
 Ric Lutze as Harry
 Carl Monson (uncredited) as Officer O'Columbus
 Zach Moye

See also
 List of American films of 1973

References

External links
 
 
 

1973 films
1970s comedy horror films
American comedy horror films
American sex comedy films
1970s English-language films
American independent films
American sexploitation films
1970s sex comedy films
1973 comedy films
1970s American films